The Revolutionary Workers' Party–Struggle (Spanish: Partido Obrero Revolucionario-Combate, POR-C) was a small Trotskyist political party in Bolivia. The Revolutionary Workers' Party–Struggle was established in 1957 by a dissident group which broke away from the Revolutionary Workers' Party.
Led by workers' leader Hugo Gonzáles Moscoso.

In 1980 the POR-C allied with the Revolutionary Party of the Nationalist Left and its candidate Juan Lechín Oquendo.

In 1984, the POR-C merged with the Workers' Vanguard Party to form the new Revolutionary Workers' Party-Unified.

Notes

1957 establishments in Bolivia
Communist parties in Bolivia
Defunct political parties in Bolivia
Political parties established in 1957
Political parties with year of disestablishment missing
Trotskyist organisations in Bolivia